Goodly Rath, also spelled Goodli, is an Indian film composer, musician, and singer. His range of work includes playback singing, vocal arrangements, musical arrangements, background scores, music programming, production. His unique style and musical enthusiasm has attracted various collaborations with many leading producers.

Early life
He was born in Bhubaneswar, Orissa in 1973. He was born to a family of musicians. His mother, Pravabati Rath was a state-level singer. His mother holds a gold medal in singing. His maternal grandfather is Khetramohan Kar, who was a renowned tabla player. Rath has four elder brothers and a sister. He completed his high school in  Buxi Jagabandhu English Medium School and his bachelor's degree from Buxi Jagabandhu College, Bhubaneswar. From his early childhood he was very interested in music and showed a keen interest towards playing different musical instruments. Rath and his four elder brothers formed a band, The Brothers, when he was very young. One of his brothers, Kabuli Rath, is a musician with AR Rahman.

Professional life
He is known for his work in Oriya films like Aaa Re Saathi Aa, Anjali, Loafer, 143 - I Love You, I Most Wanted, and Chocolate.

He is particularly known for revolutionizing the Oriya music industry. He is known to write and sing his songs sometimes.
His major contribution was to renovate the music industry by bringing in Western music to the movies.
He is one of the judges for the famous TV program Voice of Odisha for the TV channel Tarang. He was associated with Sarthak TV's Singing Super Star as a Judge. Currently he chairs as Maha Guru in "Zee Sarthak" TV's SaReGaMaPa Singing Reality Show.

Personal life
He lives in Bhubaneswar, Odisha. He married his school time sweetheart Mili Rath in 2000. His daughter, Priyanka Rath, has also started acting as a child actor.

Filmography
 Idiot: I Do Ishq Only Tumse (2012)
 Chocolate (2011)
 143 - I Love You (2011)
 Family No.1 (2011)
 Loafer (2011)
 Most Wanted (2011)
 Anjali (2010)
 Chup Kie Asuchi... (2009)
 Aaa Re Saathi Aa (2009)
 Tiger (2016)
 Sweet Heart (2016)
 Tu kahibu Na Mun (2016)

References

External links
 
 Best Of Goodly Rath-Music

Living people
Indian film score composers
Indian male singers
1973 births
Indian male film score composers